James Henry Arrol Hunter (30 March 1924 – 15 December 1988) was a British sailor. He competed in the 6 Metre event at the 1948 Summer Olympics.

References

External links
 

1924 births
1988 deaths
British male sailors (sport)
Olympic sailors of Great Britain
Sailors at the 1948 Summer Olympics – 6 Metre
Place of birth missing